The 1995 Missouri Valley Conference men's soccer season was the 5th season of men's varsity soccer in the conference.

The 1995 Missouri Valley Conference Men's Soccer Tournament was hosted by Evansville and won by Creighton.

Teams

MVC Tournament

See also 

 Missouri Valley Conference
 Missouri Valley Conference men's soccer tournament
 1995 NCAA Division I men's soccer season
 1995 in American soccer

References 

Missouri Valley Conference
1995 NCAA Division I men's soccer season